Pi was a Zhou dynasty (1045–256 BC) vassal state in ancient China. Also known as Xue, Pi was ruled by members of the Ren (任) family.

Its progenitor Xi Zhong (奚仲), had been the Minister of Chariots (车正) for Yu the Great during the Xia Dynasty (~2070–1600 BCE) who was given land at the confluence of the Dan (丹水) and Yi Rivers (沂水) in the southern part of modern-day Shandong Province.

During the Western Zhou Dynasty (1046–771 BCE), the State of Pi shares a border with the State of Song to the east and the State of Tan (郯国) to the north.

History

Oracle bone inscriptions dating to the Shang Dynasty (1600–1046 BCE) show the Chinese characters “丕” and “邑” (literally: grand city) side by side; these were later combined into the single form “邳”.

In the Shang Dynasty (1600–1046 BC), Pi was at war with the imperial court in order to resist their attempts to govern the state. Later on, Pi was defeated by the State of Peng. In 418 BCE the State of Qi moved into Xue's territory forcing its inhabitants to move south into Lower Pi (邳下), which was located on the lower reaches of the Si River. Upper Pi (邳上) lay to the north along the same river. The state was eventually overthrown by the State of Chu.

With its history of more than 1,500 years, Pi made an important contribution to the development of the eastern Xuzhou region.

References

Ancient Chinese states
Zhou dynasty